Galbally may refer to:

Locations
Galbally, County Limerick, Republic of Ireland
Galbally, County Tyrone, Northern Ireland

People with the surname
Ann Galbally (born 1945), Australian art historian and academic
Bob Galbally (1921–2004), Australian footballer
Frank Galbally (1922–2005), Australian criminal defence lawyer
John Galbally (1910–1990), Australian footballer and politician
Rhonda Galbally (born 1948), Australian academic and administrator in the field of health policy